Woburn Memorial High School (WMHS) is a public high school in Woburn, Massachusetts, United States. It is part of the Woburn Public Schools district and participates in the Middlesex League. It is home to the Tanners and Tannerettes and the nickname "Tanners" has a historical context. In the late 19th century, Woburn was one of the biggest producers of leather in the New England area. The shops that produced leather were called tanneries, hence the nickname Tanners.

Academics 
All students enrolled in Woburn Memorial High School are subject to MCAS testing when required. As of spring 2014, within the English and Language Arts category, 40% of students were Advanced, compared to a 41% statewide, 51% were proficient, compared to 49% statewide. 7% were classified as needing improvement compared to an 8% statewide, and 2% failed, compared to 2% statewide. Within the Mathematics category, 46% of students were classified as Advanced, compared to 53% statewide, 30% were proficient, compared to 26% statewide, 17% needed improvement, compared to 15% statewide. 6% failed, compared to 6% statewide. Within the Science and Technology/Engineering category, 25% of students were advanced, compared to 29% statewide. 42% were proficient, compared to 42% statewide, 29% of students needed improvement, compared to 24% statewide. 4% failed, comparable to 5% statewide.

History 

1852: The first Woburn High School opened above a store on Main Street
1906: The original building, known to most as building 7, of the "old Woburn High" was constructed
1930s: The wings on building 7 were constructed
1978: Girls Varsity Field Hockey Team wins Division I State Championship
1991-1992; 2002-2003: Boys' Hockey wins Middlesex League title.
1986: Girls Varsity Basketball Team wins Middlesex League Title
1999: Boys Golf Team wins State Championship
2000-2001: Boys' Soccer and Golf Teams win State Championships; Boys' Wrestling Team win Middlesex League, Middlesex Tournament, Sectional, State and All-State Titles.
2002: Boys Golf Team wins State Championship
2005: Boys Hockey Team Division 1 North Champions and State Finalists
2005-2006: Boys Indoor Track Team wins State Relays with dominant hurdle performance 
2006: The new Woburn Memorial High School building opens in September for the 2006-2007 school year
2006: Boys varsity Cross Country team wins Middlesex League, Girls Hockey wins Division 1 State Championship
2007: Boys Hockey Division 1 North Champions and State Finalists
2007: Boys Outdoor Track team become tri-team champions by defeating Reading by a close margin of 2 points.
2008: Indoor Track Team become Undefeated Middlesex League Champions, Division II State champions, and All-State Champions
2008: Boys' 4 x 400 relay team wins national title.
2009: Boys Outdoor Track Team become Duel-Champs of the Middlesex League.
2011: Boys Outdoor Track Team become Undefeated Middlesex League Champions.
2016: Girls varsity Cross Country team wins Division II State Championship & Middlesex League, Girls Hockey wins Division 1 State Championship. 
2017: Girls Cross Country team wins Middlesex League. Girls hockey team becomes State Champions. Boys indoor track team wins Middlesex League.
2018: Girls hockey team becomes State Champions for second straight year. Girls indoor track team win Middlesex League and Division II State Relay Championship. Boys indoor track team wins Middlesex League.

 2019: Baseball team wins first Middlesex League title in 41 years and reaches MIAA Division 2 North finals. #byorder

Notable alumni 
 Eric Bogosian, actor, playwright, monologuist, novelist, and historian
 Charles McMahon, Marine Corporal, last casualty in Vietnam War
 David Robinson, rock drummer
 John Carter, professional ice hockey player
 Ken Weafer, Major League Baseball pitcher

References

External links 
 

Woburn, Massachusetts
Schools in Middlesex County, Massachusetts
Public high schools in Massachusetts
Educational institutions established in 1852
1852 establishments in Massachusetts